Joshua Howie (born 22 February 1976) is an English stand-up comedian, raised in London by his mother Lynne Franks and his father Paul Howie.

Early life 
Howie grew up in a Jewish household. He was a weekly boarder at Mill Hill School.

Career

Howie started performing comedy on the London comedy circuit in 2002. For years he performed on the London comedy circuit, gradually working his way through the ranks.

Howie presented his first Edinburgh Festival Fringe show, Chosen, in 2008; it received considerable critical acclaim.

Howie appeared in series three of the BBC Radio 4 stand up show 4 Stands Up in April 2009.

Howie was the presenter for the Sky Movies show "The Movie Geek".

Journalism
Howie began contributing to online men's lifestyle magazine Blokely in 2011. He also writes for The Jewish Chronicle.

References

External links
 
 
 CV at management
 Chortle biography

1976 births
English male comedians
Living people
Comedians from London
People educated at Mill Hill School
English stand-up comedians
English Jewish writers
Jewish English comedians